Frederick Burr Opper (January 2, 1857 – August 28, 1937) is regarded as one of the pioneers of American newspaper comic strips, best known for his comic strip Happy Hooligan. His comic characters were featured in magazine gag cartoons, covers, political cartoons and comic strips for six decades.

Born to Austrian-American immigrants Lewis and Aurelia Burr Oppers in Madison, Ohio, Frederick was the eldest of three children. At the age of 14, he dropped out of school to work as a printer's apprentice at the local Madison Gazette, and at 16, he moved to New York City where he worked in a store and continued to draw. He studied briefly at Cooper Union, followed by a short stint as pupil and assistant to illustrator Frank Beard.

Opper's first cartoon was published in Wild Oats in 1876, followed by cartoons and illustrations in Scribner’s Monthly and St. Nicholas Magazine. He worked as illustrator at Frank Leslie's Weekly from 1877 to 1880. Opper was then hired to draw for Puck by publishers Joseph Keppler and Adolph Schwarzmann. He stayed with Puck for 18 years, drawing everything from spot illustrations to chromolithograph covers.

Opper married Nellie Barnett on May 18, 1881. They had three children, Lawrence, Anna and Sophia.

Career

Happy Hooligan
In 1899, Opper accepted an offer by William Randolph Hearst for a position with the New York Journal. His Happy Hooligan strip first appeared in the New York Journal in 1900, and it ran until 1932. Hooligan was a tramp with a little tin can hat whose gentle simplicity and bumbling good nature made him a success. On Happy's 30th birthday, Opper threw a party attended by President Hoover, former President Coolidge, Charles Schwab, Alfred E. Smith and others.

Opper's other popular strips were Alphonse and Gaston, And Her Name Was Maud, Howsan Lott and Our Antediluvian Ancestors. Beginning in 1904, Opper drew And Her Name Was Maud, about the kicking mule Maud, into comic strips, books and animation. On May 23, 1926, he positioned And Her Name Was Maud as the topper to Happy Hooligan, where it ran until both strips came to a conclusion on October 14, 1932.

Opper's strips were very popular in Italy, where Hooligan was the most loved strip character in Italy before the coming of Mickey Mouse, as declared by the major Italian poet Attilio Bertolucci. Hooligan's name in Italy was Fortunello (small lucky), and Maud's name was Checca (Francy).

Political cartoons

Among Opper's contributions for Puck was a cartoon that satirized the rise of sensationalism in journalism: this cartoon, from March 7, 1894, shows a newspaper mogul (possibly Joseph Pulitzer) raking in the profits, yet misleading the public. Noteworthy in this political cartoon is an early use of the term "fake news."  In addition, Opper drew influential political cartoons supporting Hearst's campaign against the "trusts" with characters "Willie and Teddy", depicting William McKinley and Theodore Roosevelt, "Willie and his Papa", satirizing McKinley and "Papa Trusts", and "Nursie", a depiction of Cleveland industrialist Mark Hanna. Opper's other characters included Mr. Common Man, which is believed to be the origin of John Q. Public. His artwork appeared in Hearst's New York Journal, Boston American, Chicago Examiner, San Francisco Examiner and Los Angeles Examiner. In 1902 he published "Nursery Rhymes for Infant Industries: An Alphabet of Joyous Trusts" in which each of the 26 Alphabet letters began an anti-trust rhyme.

Opper also illustrated books for Edgar Wilson Nye, Mark Twain, Marietta Holley (ie: Samantha at Saratoga, or Racin' After Fashion), and Finley Peter Dunne, and, as well, published his own books, including Puck's Opper Book (1888), The Folks in Funnyville (1900) and Happy Hooligan Home Again (1907).

Opper was a member of several New York clubs, and he painted as a hobby. He retired in 1934 due to failing eyesight. He died August 28, 1937 at his home in New Rochelle, New York and was cremated. Cartoonists Russ Westover and Alex Raymond took part in an August 29, 1937 memorial to Opper broadcast on New York's WNEW.

References

Further reading
 McKinney, Mark. "After you, my dear fake Frenchmen: Frederick Burr Opper's Alphonse and Gaston—and Leon!." Inks: The Journal of the Comics Studies Society 1.2 (2017): 143-164. online
 Opper, Frederick Burr. Happy Hooligan: A Complete Compilation, 1904-1905 (Hyperion Press, 1977).
 Robb, Jenny E. "The Opper Project: Collaborating with Educators to Promote the Use of Editorial Cartoons in the Social Studies Classroom." RBM: A Journal of Rare Books, Manuscripts, and Cultural Heritage 10.2 (2009): 70-94. online

External links

 
 
 Opper cartoons for 1900 election  ridiculing TR and McKinley as pawns of Trusts and Sen. Hanna
 Billy Ireland Cartoon Library & Museum at The Ohio State University 
Brief biography
Opper strips and one shots
Ohio cartoonists: a bicentennial celebration
Britannica Student Encyclopedia: brief biography
Graphic Witness: biographical essay 
Lambiek: Opper
Andy's Early Comics Archive (pre-1893)
Fred Opper
Happy Hooligan (1905) Andy's Early Comics Archive
Stripper's Guide blog by Allan Holtz (blogspot.com)
 Adolph from Hamburg
 Herr Professor Schuetzenfest
 Other comic samples, editorial and magazine work 1, 2, 3, 4,  5
 Willie and His Papa - Opper cartoons about Theodore Roosevelt and William McKinley, Grosset & Dunlap, 1900 
Our Antediluvian Ancestors at Don Markstein's Toonopedia. Archived from the original on April 4, 2012
 

1857 births
1937 deaths
People from Madison, Ohio
American people of Austrian descent
American comics artists
American comic strip cartoonists
Artists from New Rochelle, New York